Zadnyaya is a rural locality (a village) in Pyatovskoye Rural Settlement, Totemsky District, Vologda Oblast, Russia. The population was 520 as of 2002. There are 9 streets.

Geography 
Zadnyaya is located 4 km southwest of Totma (the district's administrative centre) by road. Glubokoye is the nearest rural locality.

References 

Rural localities in Totemsky District